The Word of Mouth World Tour is the debut world tour by British-Irish boy band The Wanted. The tour is named after their third studio album Word of Mouth (2013). The band performed a total of 40 shows across Asia, Europe and North America.

There were 14 planned shows in Continental Europe; however on 10 December 2013 all 13 shows were cancelled. On the group's official website, scheduling conflicts were given as the reason for the cancellation.

In January 2014, it was announced that the tour would be the group's last for a while, as they want to take time out to pursue solo careers and other interests.

Opening acts
The Vamps (UK & Ireland)

Wild Heart
Girls On TV
Last Night
Can We Dance
Cecilia
 
Elyar Fox (UK & Ireland)
Midnight Red (US & Canada)
Cassio Monroe  (US & Canada)

Setlist

 "Gold Forever"
 "Glow In the Dark"
 "In The Middle"
 "Lightning"
 "Running Out Of Reasons"
 "Demons"
 "Could This Be Love"
 "Warzone"
 Medley: 
 "Behind Bars"
 "Say It On The Radio" 
 "Replace Your Heart" 
 "Lose My Mind"
 "Everybody Knows"
 "Heartbreak Story" 
 "Show Me Love (America)"
 "Heart Vacancy"
 "Walks Like Rihanna"
 "Chasing the Sun"
 "I Found You"
 "We Own the Night"
 "All Time Low"
Encore
  "Glad You Came"

Tour dates

Festivals and other miscellaneous performances
Dubai International Jazz Festival
Universal Orlando Mardi Gras

Cancellations and rescheduled shows

References

The Wanted
2014 concert tours